Enterprise relationship management or ERM is a business method in relationship management.

See also
 Enterprise feedback management (EFM)
 Business relationship management (BRM)
 Enterprise planning systems

References

Primary sources
 
 Inmon, W. H., et al. (2001). Data Warehousing for E-business. John Wiley & Sons, New York, NY
 Kalmbach, Charles, Jr., and Charles Roussel (1999). "Outlook by Issue: 1999, Special Edition: Dispelling the Myths of Alliances". Accenture.com
 
 Normann, Richard, and Rafael Ramirez (1993). "From Value Chain, to Value Constellation: Designing Interactive Strategy". Harvard Business Review on Managing the Value Chain. Harvard Business School Press, 2000, 185–220.
 Torkia, Eric (2005). "Velox ERM: Building an Enterprise Relationship Management Framework". Montreal: UQAM (Université du Québec à Montréal).
 Harbison, J.R., Pekar, P.jr., Viscio, A. and Moloney, D. (2000) The Allianced Enterprise: Breakout Strategy for the New Millennium, BoozAllen & Hamilton.
Gretchen Teagarden, Solomon Smith Barney, 2000

Footnotes

Management by type
Office and administrative support occupations
Customer relationship management